Barns is a surname. Notable people with the name include:

Caleb P. Barns (1812–1866) American lawyer, businessman, and legislator
Charles Edward Barns (1862–1937), American writer, journalist, astronomer, theater impresario, and publisher
Chris Barns, founder of the Kangaroo Sanctuary
Cornelia Barns (1888–1941), American feminist, socialist, and political cartoonist
Ethel Barns (1873–1948), English violinist, pianist and composer
Graeme Barns (born 1962), Australian rower
Greg Barns Australian barrister, author
J. W. B. Barns (1912–1974), British Egyptologist, papyrologist, Anglican priest, and academic
Paul D. Barns (1894–1973), American judge
Thomas Alexander Barns (1881–1930), English naturalist and explorer

See also
Barnes (name), given name and surname